David or Dave Sullivan may refer to:
Dave Sullivan (boxer) (1877–1929), Irish-American boxer
David Sullivan (labor leader) (1904–1976), American labor leader
David O. Sullivan (c. 1924–2012), American intelligence officer
David Sullivan (businessman) (born 1949), British pornographic magazine publisher and football club owner
David B. Sullivan (born 1953), member of the Massachusetts House of Representatives
Dave Sullivan (wrestler) (born 1957), American professional wrestler
Dave Sullivan (California politician), mayor of Huntington Beach, California
Dave Sullivan (Illinois politician) (born 1964), former Illinois State Senator
David Sullivan (footballer) (born 1966), Australian rules footballer
David Sullivan (actor) (born 1977), American film and television actor

See also
David O'Sullivan (disambiguation)